The visual appearance of objects is given by the way in which they reflect and transmit light. The color of objects is determined by the parts of the spectrum of (incident white) light that are reflected or transmitted without being absorbed. Additional appearance attributes are based on the directional distribution of reflected (BRDF) or transmitted light (BTDF) described by attributes like glossy, shiny versus dull, matte, clear, turbid, distinct, etc.

Appearance of reflective objects

The appearance of reflecting objects is determined by the way the surface reflects incident light. The reflective properties of the surface can be characterized by a closer look at the (micro)-topography of that surface.

Structures on the surface and the texture of the surface are determined by typical dimensions between some 10 mm and 0.1 mm (the detection limit of the human eye is at ~0.07 mm).  Smaller structures and features of the surface cannot be directly detected by the unaided eye, but their effect becomes apparent in objects or images reflected in the surface. Structures at and below 0.1 mm reduce the distinctness of image (DOI), structures in the range of 0.01 mm induce haze and even smaller structures affect the gloss of the surface.

Definitiondiffusion, scattering: process by which the spatial distribution of a beam of radiation is changed in many directions when it is deviated by a surface or by a medium, without change of frequency of its monochromatic components.

Basic types of light reflection

{| class="wikitable"
|-
|width="150" valign="top" align="center"|

|width="150" valign="top" align="center"|

|width="160" valign="top" align="center"|

|rowspan="2"|
 Specular reflection: a perfectly smooth surface (mirror) reflects incoming beams of light in such a way that the angle of inclination of the reflected beam, θr, is exactly the same as the angle of the incident beam, θi.
 Reflection haze: structures on the surface scatter the incident light beam into directions that do not coincide with the specular direction. The radiant power of the incident beam is distributed among all reflected beams, and the maximum of power is usually reflected in the specular direction. Width and height of the bell-shaped curve in fig. 2.2 are depending on details of the surface (micro)-topography.
 Lambertian reflection: this type of reflection represents an extreme case, since all incident light is scattered into the hemisphere above the surface with the radiance being the same for all directions (isotropic directional distribution). Plain white paper for photocopiers or printers is a good example for a Lambertian diffuse reflector.
|-
|colspan="3"  align="left"|Figures 2: Illustration of the basic types of reflection – specular (mirror like, left), haze (center) and Lambertian diffuse (right). The geometry is shown in the upper part, the intensity versus angle of inclination of a detector is shown in the lower part of the diagrams.|-
|}

Appearance of transmissive objects

TerminologyReflective objects 

 Reflectance factor, R
 Gloss reflectance factor, Rs
 Gloss (at least six types of gloss may be observed depending upon the character of the surface and the spatial (directional) distribution of the reflected light.)
 Specular gloss
 Distinctness of image gloss
 Sheen
 Reflection haze, H (for a specified specular angle), the ratio of (light) flux reflected at a specified angle (or angles) from the specular direction to the flux similarly reflected at the specular angle by a specified gloss standard.Transmissive objects 

 Transmittance, T
 Haze (turbidity)
 Clarity

See also
 Shading

References

 R. S. Hunter, R. W. Harold: The Measurement of Appearance, 2nd Edition, Wiley-IEEE (1987)
 CIE No 38-1977: Radiometric and photometric characteristics of materials and their measurement
 CIE No 44-1979: Absolute methods for reflection measurementsBRDF'''
 F. E. Nicodemus, et al., Geometric Considerations and Nomenclature for Reflectance, U.S. Dept. of Commerce, NBS Monograph 160 (1977)
 John C. Stover, Optical Scattering, Measurement and Analysis, SPIE Press (1995)

Optics